Anoplognatho is a genus of rhinoceros beetles in the family Scarabaeidae. There is one described species in Anoplognatho, A. dunnianus.

References

Further reading

 
 
 
 

Dynastinae
Monotypic Scarabaeidae genera
Articles created by Qbugbot